Ali Nasser Al-Qardai (:1858–1948) was a Yemeni poet, revolutionary and tribal leader.

Biography 
Ali was born in 1885 in Al-Rahaba district, Marib Governorate. He received no formal education. Instead, he hired a private teacher. In 1925 he succeeded his father as chief of Murad tribes. Al-Qardai opposed Imam Yahya and criticized his rule using poetry. After Imam failed to buy his loyalty and influence his tribes, he sent a military campaign to arrest him in 1929. Tribes led by Ali resisted the campaign, but he and his brother Ahmed were imprisoned two years later. His brother was sentenced to death, and he was imprisoned until he escaped in 1936. 

In 1940, he joined the Free Yemeni Movement that planned the 1948 Revolution. He was tasked with assassinating Imam Yahy. On 17 February 1948, Al-Qardai shot and killed the Imam in an ambush outside of Sana'a.  The revolution failed and was quelled by the son of Imam Yahya Ahmed. Al-Qardai was arrested in Khawlan. He was beheaded and his head was hung for two months at the gate of Sana'a.

References 

1885 births
Yemeni revolutionaries
Yemeni tribal chiefs
20th-century Yemeni poets
19th-century Yemeni poets
1948 deaths
People from Marib Governorate